Sallyann Amdur Sack is an American genealogist and psychologist, and editor of Avotaynu Magazine, a journal of Jewish genealogy and scholarship. Sack is the only genealogist listed in Jewish Women in America. She was instrumental in founding the International Institute for Jewish Genealogy (currently chairperson of the board), Jewish Genealogy Society of Greater Washington (founding president), International Association of Jewish Genealogical Societies, and Avotaynu. Sack has chaired or co-chaired seven of the annual conferences on Jewish genealogy, authored seven books of use to genealogists and has consulted on numerous projects. A recipient of IAJGS Lifetime Achievement Award, she resides in Bethesda, Maryland, where she is a clinical psychologist in private practice, having received her degrees from Harvard University and George Washington University.

Published works
Avotaynu Guide to Jewish Genealogy
Where Once We Walked, a Guide to Jewish Communities Destroyed in the Holocaust. Winner of Best Reference Book of the Year of the Association of Jewish Libraries.
Jewish Genealogical Research in Israel
Russian Consular Records Index and Catalog
Jewish Vital Records, Revision Lists and Other Jewish Holdings in the Lithuanian Archives
Some Archival Sources for Ukrainian Jewish Genealogy 
Search for the Family

References

External links
Guide to the Sallyann Sack Papers at the American Jewish Historical Society, New York.

American genealogists
Jewish genealogy
Jewish scholars
1936 births
Living people
American women historians
Jewish American historians
Writers from Cleveland
Harvard University alumni
George Washington University alumni
Historians from Ohio